Joseph Preston may refer to:

 Joe Preston (politician) (born 1955), Canadian politician
 Joe Preston (musician) (born 1969), American bassist
 Joe Preston (EP), 1992
 Joseph Preston (cricketer) (1864–1890), English cricketer
 Joseph Preston Jr. (born 1947), American politician from Pennsylvania
 Joseph E. Preston (born 1956), American politician from Virginia

Preston, Joseph